The Indian football league system is the league structure of football club competitions in India. The highest level of men's club football competition in India is the Indian Super League. Indian Women's League, founded in 2016, is the highest level of women's football club competition in India.

Men's
The Indian men's football league system consists of top 3 national divisions organised by the All India Football Federation (AIFF) and partners. From tier 4 are the various regional state football leagues, organised by the respective state associations under AIFF affiliation.

Current system

Evolution

History of the Indian league system's national tiers

Women's

The women's football league system in India currently consists of 1 top tier national league i.e. Indian Women's League, organised by the All India Football Federation (AIFF). From tier 2 are the State football leagues, organised by regional state associations under AIFF affiliation, in the league tier pyramid of women's football in India.

Current system

History of the Indian women's league system's national tiers

Youth

Boys

National Football Championships
The National Football Championships are football knock-out competitions contested among the regional state associations and government institutions under the All India Football Federation. Currently there are 6 championship competitions divided as age groups for both men and women. For sponsorship ties it is referred as Hero National Football Championships.

Senior NFC (Santosh Trophy)

The Santosh Trophy is a men's football  competition contested by the regional state associations and government institutions under the AIFF. Before the starting of the National Football League in 1996, the Santosh Trophy was considered the top domestic championship in India.

Senior Women's NFC

Senior Women's National Football Championship is the women's football tournament which is contested among the regional state, territory federations and government institutions of India.  It began to play in 1991. The league consisted of 30 teams for the 2019–20 season.

Junior NFC & Sub-Junior NFC

The Junior National Football Championship or BC Roy Trophy is for the Junior age groups, which was started in 1962. All affiliated State Units of AIFF are eligible to participate in this championship through the two tiers of the competition which is played across the country.

The Sub Junior National Football Championship or Mir Iqbal Hussain Trophy is a national level inter-state championship for boys under the age of 16, which was started in 1977. All affiliated State Units of AIFF are eligible to participate in this championship through the qualifying round.

Junior Girls' NFC & Sub-Junior Girls' NFC

The U-19 Junior Girls' National Football Championship was first introduced in the year 2001. This championship National Level inter-state championship, which is played every year at one venue chosen by the AIFF Executive Committee.  All affiliated State Associations of AIFF are eligible to participate in this Championship, which is played on league-cum-knockout basis.

The U-17 Sub-Junior Girls' National Football Championship was first introduced in the year 2003, which was held at Ooty, Tamil Nadu.  This championship is a national level inter-state championship, which is played every year at one venue chosen by the AIFF Executive Committee.  All affiliated State Associations of AIFF are eligible to participate in this Championship, which is played on league-cum-knockout basis.

Proposed system 2023-2026
On 7 January 2023, the AIFF unveiled 'Vision 2047' a new roadmap for Indian football which had the planned reform in India's league system. The following table is for the season 2026–27 onwards.

Men's

Women's

Youth

Proposed League structure Vision 2047

2023 - 2026

AIFF has broken down ‘Vision 2047’ into six four-year strategic plans. The first of these will look to cover the period till 2026. According this plan in 2026 Indian football season 40 clubs will participate in ISL(14 clubs), I-League (14 clubs) and I-League-2 (12clubs). Moreover 60 clubs will participate in 5 zonal leagues with minimum 12 teams in each zone. 

How ever AIFF's new strategic plan 2026, the number of teams in the current leagues needs to be increased. By the 2026 season, ILeague-2 will have to be rebranded to a full league format with at least 12 teams with relegation and promotion. In 2026 season onwards State FA league champions won't promote directly to I-League2. SFA champions will promote their respective Zonal league and Then each Zonal league champions will play I-League-2 qualifier.

2026-2027

Regional League and Zonal League

According to Vision 2047, there will be 40 clubs in various national leagues when the first strategic plan is completed by the 2026 season. Also there will be 60 clubs in 5 zonal leagues. Apart from this there will be 300-450 clubs in 30-35 State Football Associations leagues. The state football associations produces 30-35 state champions every season. The proposed system is unable to accommodate these SFA champions. This will pave the way for revamping the zonal league into a new structure.

Regional League

All SFAs under AIFF are divided into 2 regions to form a Regional league below I-League2. The bottom teams in I-League2 will relegate to Regional League and the champions of Regional League will promote to I-League2.

Bottom teams in Regional League will relegate to Zonal league. Zonal League champions will promote to Regional League.

Zonal League
Currently the zones are divided by geographically. North, West,East, South and North-East are the five zones. As per the new system, while zones are divided in proportion to the number of SFAs. According to this, there will be 8/12 zones instead of the current 5 zones. Each season SFA League Champions will be promoted to each Zonal League and teams who finish bottom in Zonal League will be relegated to SFA Leagues.Zonal league champions will be promoted to regional leagues.

According to the Vision 2047 after completing the second strategic plan in 2030 the Indian football structure would be like this.

Notes

See also 
 Sports in India
 Football in India
 Durand Cup
 Super Cup
 IFA Shield
 AIFF Futsal Club Championship

References

External links
 Official website of AIFF

Football leagues in India
Football league systems in Asia